Stand by Me: The Ultimate Collection is Ben E. King's 16th album and his second compilation album.  The album was released in 1987 and includes many hits such as "Stand By Me", the original "Spanish Harlem", and "Young Boy Blues".

However, the single "In the Middle of the Night", released on the Seven Letters album, is one of his better known songs that was not included on this compilation.

Track listing
"Stand by Me" – 2:58
from the album Don't Play That Song!
"Save the Last Dance for Me" – 2:34
from the album Save the Last Dance for Me
"I Who Have Nothing" – 2:23
from the album Young Boy Blues
"That's When It Hurts" – 3:16
from the album Ben E. King's Greatest Hits
"I Could Have Danced All Night" – 2:35
from the album Ben E. King's Greatest Hits
"First Taste of Love" – 2:21
from the album Don't Play That Song!
"Dream Lover" – 2:39
from the album Ben E. King Sings for Soulful Lovers
"Moon River" – 2:53
from the album Ben E. King Sings for Soulful Lovers
"Spanish Harlem" – 2:54
from the album Spanish Harlem
"Amor" – 3:03
from the album Spanish Harlem
"I Count the Tears" (With The Drifters) – 2:07
from the albums Save the Last Dance for Me and Up On the Roof, both with The Drifters; single released in 1960
"Don't Play That Song (You Lied)" – 2:47
from the album Don't Play That Song!
"This Magic Moment" (with The Drifters) – 2:29
from the 1963 album Up On the Roof with The Drifters; single released in 1960
"Young Boy Blues" – 2:18
from the albums Don't Play That Song! and Young Boy Blues
"It's All in the Game" – 2:52
from the album Ben E. King Sings for Soulful Lovers
"Supernatural Thing, Part 1" – 3:54
from the album Supernatural
"On the Street Where You Live" – 3:45
from the album Ben E. King Sings for Soulful Lovers
"Will You Still Love Me Tomorrow" – 3:06
from the album Ben E. King Sings for Soulful Lovers
"Show Me the Way" – 2:19
from the albums Don't Play That Song! and Young Boy Blues
"Here Comes the Night" – 2:24
from the albums Don't Play That Song! and Young Boy Blues

1987 greatest hits albums
Ben E. King compilation albums